Yaza Wunthalini or more commonly known as Pagan Yazawin Thit is a 19th-century Burmese chronicle that covers the history of the Pagan Dynasty.

References

Bibliography
 

Burmese chronicles